Shlomi is a town in the Northern District of Israel.

History

Shlomi was founded as a development town in 1950 by Jewish immigrants from Tunisia and Morocco on the ruins of a Palestinian village of al-Bassa,  (which Adolf Neubauer "proposed to identify... with the Batzet of the Talmud"), which had been destroyed during the 1948 Arab–Israeli War. The Arab village was stormed by Haganah troops in May 1948 and almost completely razed. Its residents were either internally displaced or expelled to neighboring countries. The new Jewish settlement was named after a leader from the tribe of Asher, mentioned in the Bible (Num 34:27).

Shlomi has been the target of Hezbollah Katyusha rocket attacks on 11 May 2005, Israel's Independence Day, and again on Israel's Independence Day in 2006.

It was again the target of rocket attacks on 12 July 2006, a diversion to facilitate the killing of three soldiers and kidnapping two others, which sparked the 2006 Lebanon War.

Archaeology
On the road between Shlomi and Kibbutz Hanita, Israeli archaeologists found the remains of Pi Metzuba, a prosperous Christian town mentioned in the Jerusalem Talmud. The town was destroyed in the early seventh century when Persia invaded the region as part of its broader conflict with the Byzantine Empire.

References

External links

History of Shlomi  

Development towns
Local councils in Northern District (Israel)
Populated places established in 1950
1950 establishments in Israel